Snap, Crackle & Bop is the fourth album by John Cooper Clarke, originally released in 1980. As with Disguise in Love, the album featured The Invisible Girls as the backing band and was produced by Martin Hannett. Original first pressings of the LP included a booklet with the lyrics from John Cooper Clarke's 1978 album Disguise in Love together with photographs and artwork, the booklet was housed in a pocket that formed part of the jacket on the LP cover photograph. The album placed at No. 39 in NME's 1980 Albums of the Year.

Track listing 
All tracks written by John Cooper Clarke, Martin Hannett and Steve Hopkins except where noted:

 "Evidently Chickentown" – 2.23
 "Conditional Discharge" –  3.10
 "Sleepwalk" – 4.35
 "23rd" – 3.38
 "Beasley Street" – 6.56
 "Thirty Six Hours" – 3.35
 "Belladonna" – 4.18
 "The It Man" –  3.48
 "Limbo (Baby Limbo)" – 4.31
 "A Distant Relation" –  3.53
 "Beasley Street" (live - bonus track) –  3.28
 "Gaberdine Angus" (live - bonus track) –  1.01
 "Twat" (live - bonus track) – 2.23

Note: "Evidently Chickentown" is similar to the 1952 poem "The Bloody Orkneys" by Hamish Blair.

Charts

Personnel 
John Cooper Clarke – vocals
The Invisible Girls
Paul Burgess – drums, percussion
Martin Hannett – bass guitar
Steve Hopkins – keyboards
Technical
Paul Welsh, Peter Saville - design
Bob Elsdale - photography

"Written, played, produced by The Invisible Girls, ably assisted by Lynn Oakey, Pete Shelley, Trevor Spencer, Paul Burgess, Karl Burns, Toby, Dave Hassell, Stephanie Formula. Extra special thanks to Vinnie Riley. The Invisible Girls are the cheese nightmares are Martin Hannett & Steve Hopkins!"

References

External links 
John Cooper Clarke Home Page

John Cooper Clarke albums
1980 albums
Albums produced by Martin Hannett
CBS Records albums